Matilda Hansen (September 4, 1929 - August 19, 2019) was an American politician in the state of Wyoming. She served in the Wyoming House of Representatives as a member of the Democratic Party. She attended the University of Wyoming and University of Colorado and was a teacher.

References

1929 births
2019 deaths
Democratic Party members of the Wyoming House of Representatives
Schoolteachers from Wyoming
American women educators
University of Wyoming alumni
University of Colorado alumni
Women state legislators in Wyoming
People from O'Brien County, Iowa
20th-century American women politicians
20th-century American politicians
21st-century American women